Hôtel de Villeroy may refer to:

Hôtel de Villeroy (Paris, 1st arrondissement)
Hôtel de Villeroy (Paris, 7th arrondissement)